Self-help group may refer to:

Support group, group in which members provide each other with various types of help for a particular shared characteristic
Self-help group (finance), village-based financial intermediary usually composed of between 10-15 local women